Laurie Weeks is an American writer and performer based in New York City. Her fiction and essays have been published extensively. She is best known as the screenwriter of Boys Don't Cry, and is the Lambda Literary Award-winning author of the novel Zipper Mouth.

Career 
Weeks holds a Master of Arts in Performance Studies from New York University and has taught at The New School in New York City in the creative writing program. In 1996, she was awarded a fiction fellowship by the New York Foundation for the Arts.

Works 
Weeks' writing has been included in The New Fuck You: Adventures in Lesbian Reading (Semiotext(e), 1995), as well as in Dave Eggers's The Best American Nonrequired Reading 2008.

She was the screenwriter of the lesbian cult film, Boys Don't Cry (1999), which was a retelling of the Brandon Teena murder.

Her debut novel Zipper Mouth was published by Feminist Press in 2011 and was awarded a Lambda Literary Award for Debut Lesbian Fiction.

Bibliography 
 Zipper Mouth, The Feminist Press at CUNY, 2011.

In popular culture
Her name appears in the lyrics of the Le Tigre song "Hot Topic."

References

External links 

 The Rumpus Book Club interview, December 1, 2011.
 B omb Magazine interview, November 8, 2011
 "My Massive Feelings (fragments From The Diary Of A Young Girl)," fiction, Vice, December 1, 2007

American women short story writers
Tisch School of the Arts alumni
Year of birth missing (living people)
Living people
Lambda Literary Award for Debut Fiction winners
21st-century American short story writers
American lesbian writers
American women essayists
21st-century American essayists
21st-century American women writers